The Future of the Mind: The Scientific Quest to Understand, Enhance, and Empower the Mind is a popular science book by the futurist and physicist Michio Kaku. 
The book was initially published on February 25, 2014 by Doubleday.

In 2015 the book was translated into Hebrew.

Overview
The book discusses various possibilities of advanced technology that can alter the brain and mind. Looking into things such as telepathy, telekinesis, consciousness, artificial intelligence, and transhumanism, the book covers a wide range of topics. In it, Kaku proposes a "spacetime theory of consciousness". Similarly to Ray Kurzweil, he believes the advances in silicon computing will serve our needs as opposed to producing a generation of robot overlords.

Reception
On March 16, 2014, The Future of the Mind made number one on The New York Times Bestseller list.

References

External links
 Michio Kaku's official website
 Booksite

2014 non-fiction books
Books by Michio Kaku
Popular science books
Futurology books
Doubleday (publisher) books